Massachusetts House of Representatives' 12th Plymouth district in the United States is one of 160 legislative districts included in the lower house of the Massachusetts General Court. It covers part of Plymouth County. Democrat Kathy LaNatra of Kingston has represented the district since 2019.

Towns represented
The district includes the following localities:
 part of Duxbury
 Halifax
 Kingston
 part of Middleborough
 part of Plymouth
 Plympton

The current district geographic boundary overlaps with those of the Massachusetts Senate's 1st Plymouth and Bristol district, 2nd Plymouth and Bristol district, Plymouth and Barnstable district, and Plymouth and Norfolk district.

Former locale
The district previously covered Abington, circa 1872.

Representatives
 Daniel U. Johnson, circa 1858-1859 
 William L. Reed, circa 1858-1859 
 Charles C. Bixby, circa 1888 
 Mark E. Lawton, circa 1975 
 Robert Kraus
 Thomas J. O'Brien
 Thomas Calter
 Kathleen R. LaNatra, 2019-current

See also
 List of Massachusetts House of Representatives elections
 Other Plymouth County districts of the Massachusetts House of Representatives: 1st, 2nd, 3rd, 4th, 5th, 6th, 7th, 8th, 9th, 10th, 11th
 List of Massachusetts General Courts
 List of former districts of the Massachusetts House of Representatives

Images
Portraits of legislators

References

External links
 Ballotpedia
  (State House district information based on U.S. Census Bureau's American Community Survey).
 League of Women Voters Plymouth Area

House
Government of Plymouth County, Massachusetts